Daniel Peter Masterson (born March 13, 1976) is an American actor. He played the roles of Steven Hyde in That '70s Show (1998–2006), Milo Foster in Men at Work (2012–2014) and Jameson "Rooster" Bennett in The Ranch (2016–2018).

On June 17, 2020, Masterson was arrested and charged with three counts of forcible rape. After a 2022 trial, the judge declared a mistrial after the jury was deadlocked on the charges.  A new trial was set for March 2023, then rescheduled to April 2023.

Early life and family
Masterson was born on Long Island, New York, the son of Carol, a manager, and Peter Masterson, an insurance agent. He grew up in Garden City and East Williston, New York. He has a brother, actor Christopher Masterson, who played Francis on Malcolm in the Middle. Their maternal half-siblings, Jordan Masterson and Alanna Masterson, are also actors. He also has a paternal half-brother, Will Masterson.

Career

Early years
Masterson was a child model from age four, and was featured in magazine articles as well as television commercials beginning at age five. Masterson starred in musicals at the age of eight, and began acting as well. His singing voice "disappeared" by the time he was a teenager. By the time he was 16, he had appeared in over 100 commercials, including ones for Kellogg's Frosted Flakes, Hardee's, Hostess, Tang, and Clearasil.

Acting career
In the early 1990s, Masterson had a role in Beethoven's 2nd, and starred as Justin in Cybill. After starring in the third and fourth seasons of Cybill, Masterson decided he wanted to move on and audition for a show originally titled Teenage Wasteland, which later was changed to That '70s Show. The original casting director for That '70s Show, Debby Romano, resisted Masterson's audition because he was slightly older than the rest of the cast, but ultimately allowed him to audition. She stated that, "he came in and he was just so funny", and that he redefined where the role was going and made the role of Steven Hyde the "tough, funny guy."

Masterson starred in all eight seasons of That '70s Show. His role on That '70s Show launched Masterson's career, allowing him to pursue other endeavours between tapings. After the show concluded Masterson acted in several movies and made guest appearances on television shows including Punk'd and MADtv. Along with 70's costars Ashton Kutcher and Wilmer Valderrama, he co-hosted the Fox TV special Woodstock 1999. He had a role in the 2008 comedy Yes Man. Masterson starred with his real-life wife, Bijou Phillips, in the 2009 drama The Bridge to Nowhere.

In 2011, Masterson guest starred as James Roland in USA Network's White Collar (episode "Where There's A Will"). He portrayed Jerry Rubin in the 2010 movie, The Chicago 8.

In 2012, the sitcom Men At Work premiered on TBS, co-starring Masterson and Michael Cassidy, James Lesure and Adam Busch. In 2012, Masterson appeared in the film Alter Egos, directed by Jordan Galland.

Masterson starred alongside Sam Elliott, Ashton Kutcher, and Elisha Cuthbert in the Netflix comedy series The Ranch from 2016 to 2018. His character was written out of the series in the middle of filming the third 20-episode season due to his rape and assault allegations.

Due to the allegations and the resulting trial, Masterson was also the only surviving main or supporting cast member of That '70s Show not to be invited back to the sequel series That '90s Show, and his character of Steven Hyde was simply not mentioned in the new series. His former cast mate on That '70s Show and a fellow Scientologist, Laura Prepon, had left the Church by the time of Masterson's allegations.

Other ventures
Masterson began DJing at Los Angeles night clubs in 1997 as a hobby, under the name DJ Donkey Punch, but it soon became a side business. After Donkey Punch, he changed his name to DJ Donkey Pizzle, then DJ Mom Jeans by 2010. Masterson is a self-described "rock and hip hop fanatic", and is also a fan of indie, electro, and funk music, all of which he primarily DJs with.

For a time, Masterson owned a lounge and bar in Park City, Utah, called Downstairs.

He appeared as part of a poker team, the Unabombers, in the 2005 GSN series The James Woods Gang vs. The Unabombers. He has hosted celebrity poker events, such as the Phat Farm Stuff Casino Weekend Poker Tournament, in which he won the tournament.

Personal life
Masterson is a Scientologist. He started dating Bijou Phillips in 2004, they became engaged in 2009, and married on October 18, 2011. They have one daughter who was born in February 2014.

Sexual assault allegations and criminal trial

In March 2017, three women filed sexual assault allegations against Masterson, prompting a Los Angeles Police Department investigation. Masterson, through his agent, has denied the allegations. In response to the accusations, Netflix fired Masterson from its comedy series The Ranch on December 5, 2017, saying in a statement, "Yesterday was his last day on the show, and production will resume in early 2018 without him." Masterson stated that he is "obviously very disappointed in Netflix's decision to write my character off of The Ranch." A fifth woman who dated Masterson made similar rape accusations in December 2017. He was dropped as a client by United Talent Agency.

A planned 2019 episode of Leah Remini's show Aftermath, focusing on the Masterson rape allegations, was delayed due to what one of Masterson's accusers characterized as pressure from the Church of Scientology. The episode eventually aired on August 27, 2019.

Cedric Bixler-Zavala, singer for the bands The Mars Volta and At the Drive-In, alleged that Masterson sexually assaulted his wife, and stated At the Drive-In's song "Incurably Innocent" (from the 2017 album In•ter a•li•a) is about the incident.

In August 2019, four women filed a lawsuit against Masterson and the Church of Scientology for stalking and harassment, stemming from their rape allegations. One plaintiff claimed her dog died from (unexplained) traumatic injuries to its trachea and esophagus, also alleging that church members chased her as she drove her car, filmed her without permission, harassed her online and posted ads to social media sites soliciting sex in her name. Another plaintiff stated that she and her neighbors observed a man snapping pictures from her driveway and later that night someone broke a window in her 13-year-old daughter's bedroom. Such stalking and harassment claims are indicative of a Scientology policy titled Fair Game, which the Church claims was cancelled by L. Ron Hubbard in 1968, yet the plaintiffs' lawyers claim it continues still against any detractors and ex–church members, through 'outsourcing' to private investigators and off-duty police officers. Masterson has since responded to one of the plaintiffs in the lawsuit, claiming: "I'm not going to fight my ex-girlfriend in the media like she's been baiting me to do for more than two years. I will beat her in court—and look forward to it because the public will finally be able to learn the truth and see how I've been railroaded by this woman... and once her lawsuit is thrown out, I intend to sue her and the others who jumped on the bandwagon for the damage they caused me and my family." He did not address the stalking or harassment claims.

On January 22, 2020, Bixler-Zavala reported that a second of his family pets had to be put down due to being fed rat poison wrapped inside a rolled-up piece of raw meat, alleging this was done by Scientologists in response to his repeated public statements alleging Masterson raped his wife (who was one of the four women who filed suit against Masterson). Masterson has yet to directly respond to any of Bixler-Zavala's claims or his prior allegations made; the closest acknowledgment being Masterson's wife Bijou Phillips making an Instagram post mocking court papers against Masterson.

On June 17, 2020, Masterson was charged with raping a 23-year-old woman in 2001, a 28-year-old woman in early 2003, and a 23-year-old woman in late 2003. The three counts came after a three-year investigation beginning in 2017. If convicted, Masterson faces up to 45 years in prison.

On January 21, 2021, Masterson pleaded not guilty. A four-day preliminary hearing began on May 18, 2021. On May 21, 2021, Los Angeles County Superior Court Judge Charlaine F. Olmedo said that she "found all three witnesses to be credible and the evidence presented during a preliminary hearing sufficient to support the charges." She ordered that Masterson be bound over for trial on three counts of rape by force or fear and that he surrender his passport at his next arraignment, which was set for June 7, 2021.

On June 7, 2021, Masterson pleaded not guilty to rape accusations alleged to have occurred between 2001 and 2003. His defense attorney accused the three women of colluding against Masterson, claiming that they were in contact with each other and sued him in arbitration. His defense attorney also stated that one of the Jane Does had obtained money from Masterson in 2004. After the June 7th arraignment, Masterson remained free on a $3.3 million bail. A pretrial hearing was set for August 9, 2021.

During the pretrial hearing on August 9, 2021, Judge Olmedo rejected Masterson's subpoena for LAPD records related to David Miscavige, Shelly Miscavige, and Leah Remini's TV show. The defense filed a motion to dismiss the case based on a lack of evidence presented during the May preliminary hearing, prompting Judge Olmedo to send a motion that this request be heard before another judge on November 10, 2021. The motion was unsuccessful, with a criminal trial being set for August 29, 2022.

The August 29 trial date was subsequently rescheduled for October 11, 2022, at the request of Masterson's lawyers. Near the end of the month-long trial, Masterson decided not to testify nor call witnesses in his defense. Both parties rested their cases on November 14, 2022, and made their closing arguments the following day. The jury deadlocked after three days in deliberation; instead of declaring a mistrial, the judge ordered to resume deliberations the week after Thanksgiving. The jury remained deadlocked once deliberations resumed; consequently, a mistrial was declared on November 30, 2022. A new trial was set for March 2023, and then rescheduled to April 2023.

Filmography

Film

Television

Music videos

Producer

References

External links

 

1976 births
Living people
20th-century American male actors
21st-century American male actors
American DJs
American male child actors
American male film actors
American male television actors
American male voice actors
American Scientologists
Male actors from New York (state)
Masterson family
People charged with rape
People from East Williston, New York
People from Garden City, New York